Andrew Alexander Chisholm (April 1, 1915 – August 6, 1981) was a Canadian ice hockey centre. He played 61 games in the National Hockey League with the Toronto Maple Leafs between 1939 and 1941. The rest of his career, which lasted from 1934 to 1943, was spent in the minor leagues. Chisholmd was born in Galt, Ontario.

Career statistics

Regular season and playoffs

External links
 

1915 births
1981 deaths
Canadian ice hockey centres
Toronto Maple Leafs players
Ice hockey people from Ontario
Ontario Hockey Association Senior A League (1890–1979) players
Oshawa Generals players
Pittsburgh Hornets players
Sportspeople from Cambridge, Ontario
Syracuse Stars (AHL) players